Veronica scutellata is a species of flowering plant in the plantain family known by the common names marsh speedwell, skullcap speedwell, and grassleaf speedwell. It is native to temperate Asia, Europe, northern Africa, and northern North America, including most of Canada and the northern half of the United States. It occurs in moist and wet habitats, such as ponds, marshes and other wetlands. It is a rhizomatous herbaceous perennial producing a decumbent or upright stem  in maximum height. It is mostly hairless in texture. The purple-green or reddish leaves are oppositely arranged in pairs about the stem, the blades lance-shaped and smooth-edged. The inflorescence is an open array of several flowers on thin, straight pedicels. It is white, blue, or purplish with purple veining. It yields a flat, notched capsule a few millimeters wide.

References

External links
Jepson Manual Treatment
Washington Burke Museum
Photo gallery

scutellata
Plants described in 1753
Taxa named by Carl Linnaeus